Pierobon is an Italian surname. Notable people with the surname include:

Andrea Pierobon (born 1969), Italian footballer and coach
Chiara Pierobon (1993–2015), Italian cyclist
Gianluca Pierobon (born 1967), Italian cyclist

Italian-language surnames